Graptomyza is a genus of hoverflies.

Species
G. alabeta Séguy, 1948
G. amplicavum Whittington, 1992
G. angustimarginata Brunetti, 1923
G. antipoda Shannon, 1927
G. arisana Shiraki, 1930
G. atripes Bigot, 1883
G. aurea Bezzi, 1915
G. bergi Greene, 1949
G. brevirostris Wiedemann, 1820
G. breviscutum Curran, 1929
G. chaetomelas Doesburg, 1966
G. clarala Whittington, 1992
G. coniceps Meijere, 1929
G. coomani Séguy, 1948
G. cornuta Meijere, 1914
G. cynocephala Kertész, 1914
G. dentata Kertész, 1914
G. doddi Ferguson, 1926
G. dolichocera Kertész, 1914
G. elegans Hull, 1950
G. fascipennis Sack, 1922
G. flavicollis Ferguson, 1926
G. flavipes Meijere, 1911
G. flavitincta Hull, 1950
G. flavonotata Brunetti, 1917
G. flavorhyncha Hull, 1941
G. formosana Shiraki, 1930
G. gibbula Walker, 1859
G. globigaster Hull, 1943
G. hardyi Greene, 1949
G. hova Keiser, 1971
G. ihai Shiraki, 1968
G. inclusa Walker, 1856
G. interrupta Wiedemann, 1830
G. ishikawai Shiraki, 1954
G. itoi Shiraki, 1954
G. jacobsoni Meijere, 1911
G. javensis Greene, 1949
G. latiusculus Walker, 1861
G. lineata Osten Sacken, 1881
G. literata Osten Sacken, 1882
G. loewi Goot, 1964
G. longicornis Meijere, 1908
G. longirostris Wiedemann, 1820
G. longqishanica Huang & Cheng, 1995
G. lutea Whittington, 1992
G. maculipennis Meijere, 1908
G. melliponaeformis Doleschall, 1858
G. microdon Osten Sacken, 1882
G. minor Shiraki, 1963
G. mitis Curran & Bryan, 1926
G. multiseta Huang & Cheng, 1995
G. nigra Bezzi, 1915
G. nigricavum Whittington, 1992
G. nigripes Brunetti, 1913
G. nitobei Shiraki, 1930
G. obtusa Kertész, 1914
G. oceanica Shiraki, 1963
G. okawai Shiraki, 1956
G. pallidinotata Whittington, 1992
G. palmeri Greene, 1949
G. perforata Doesburg, 1960
G. periaurantaca Huang & Cheng, 1995
G. phyllocera Hull, 1950
G. plumifer Ferguson, 1926
G. punctata Meijere, 1908
G. quadrifaria Szilády, 1942
G. rectifacies Meijere, 1916
G. robusticornis Doesburg, 1957
G. seimunda Curran, 1928
G. setigloba Hull, 1941
G. sexnotata Brunetti, 1908
G. signata Walker, 1860
G. spectralis Hull, 1950
G. spinifera Whittington, 1994
G. suavissima Karsch, 1888
G. subflavonotata Mutin, 1983
G. summa Whittington, 1992
G. takeuchii Shiraki, 1954
G. tibialis Walker, 1858
G. tinctovittata Brunetti, 1915
G. triangulifera Bigot, 1883
G. trilineata Meijere, 1908
G. triseriata Meijere, 1929
G. uchiyamai ShiraAustralasiaki, 1930
G. varia Walker, 1849
G. ventralis Wiedemann, 1830
G. xanthopoda Bezzi, 1915
G. yangi Huang & Cheng, 1995
G. yasumatui Ouchi, 1943

References

Hoverfly genera
Eristalinae
Taxa named by Christian Rudolph Wilhelm Wiedemann
Diptera of Asia
Diptera of Africa